Sydney Chedgzoy (17 February 1911 – 1983) was an English professional association footballer who played as a winger for a number of Football League and non-league clubs in the 1930s.

He was the son of the Everton and England player, Sam Chedgzoy (1889–1967).

External links

1911 births
1983 deaths
English footballers
Association football midfielders
Everton F.C. players
Burnley F.C. players
Millwall F.C. players
Runcorn F.C. Halton players
Sheffield Wednesday F.C. players
Swansea City A.F.C. players
English Football League players
Footballers from Liverpool